Sorce is a surname. Notable people with the surname include:

 Freda Wright-Sorce (1955–2005), wife of Don Geronimo
 Nathalie Sorce (born 1979), Belgian singer

Italian-language surnames